The 2019–20 Slovak Basketball League season was the 28th season of the top-tier basketball competition in Slovakia. It started on 5 October 2019 and ended prematurely on 13 March 2020 without any declared champion due to the coronavirus pandemic.

Competition format
Ten teams joined the regular season, consisted in playing against each other four times home-and-away in double a round-robin format. The eight first qualified teams advance to the playoffs.

Teams

The same nine teams of the previous season repeated participation in the league.

Regular season

League table

Results

Playoffs
Seeded teams played games 1, 3, 5 and 7 at home. Quarterfinals were played in a best-of-five games format while semifinals and final with a best-of-seven one.

Bracket

Quarter-finals

|}

Semi-finals

|}

Finals

|}

Slovak clubs in European competitions

Slovak clubs in Regional competitions

References

External links
Slovak Extraliga official website

Slovak
Basketball
Slovak Extraliga (basketball)